Plainfield Township may refer to:

 Plainfield Township, Will County, Illinois
 Plainfield Township, Iosco County, Michigan
 Plainfield Township, Kent County, Michigan
 Plainfield Township, Union County, New Jersey, now the city of Plainfield
 Plainfield Township, Northampton County, Pennsylvania
 Plainfield Township, Brule County, South Dakota, in Brule County, South Dakota

Township name disambiguation pages